The British Academy Video Games Award for Multiplayer is an award presented annually by the British Academy of Film and Television Arts (BAFTA). It is given in honor of "the best multiplayer game experience, including social, online or offline". The award was formerly known as the British Academy Video Games Award for Online Multiplayer at the 2005, 2012 and 2013 ceremonies.

The award was first presented at the 1st British Academy Video Games Awards ceremony in 2004, with the EA Digital Illusions CE and Electronic Arts game Battlefield 1942 winning. Since its inception, the award has been given to eighteen games. Among developers, Valve has received the most awards, with three wins from four nominations, while Electronic Arts leads the publishers, with five wins from their sixteen nominations. Bungie holds the record for the developer with the most nominations without a win, with five Activision is the publisher with the most nominations without a win, with thirteen.

The current holder of the award is It Takes Two by Hazelight Studios and Electronic Arts, which won at the 18th British Academy Games Awards in 2022.

Winners and nominees
In the following table, the years are listed as per BAFTA convention, and generally correspond to the year of game release in the United Kingdom.

Multiple wins and nominations

Developers

The following developers received two or more Multiplayer awards:

The following developers received three or more Multiplayer nominations:

Publishers

The following publishers received two or more Multiplayer awards:

The following publishers received three or more Multiplayer nominations:

References

External links
British Academy Video Games Awards official website

Multiplayer